Maciej Dejczer is a Polish film director, best known for his film 300 Miles to Heaven (1989), which won the second European Film Award for European Discovery of the Year. He is an alumnus of the Krzysztof Kieślowski Film School in Katowice.

Filmography 
 1986: Dzieci śmieci
 1989: 300 Miles to Heaven
 1993: To musisz być ty
 1994: Jest jak jest
 1997: Bandyta
 1999–2000: Czułość i kłamstwa
 2000–2006: M jak miłość
 2001–2003: Na dobre i na złe
 2002–2006: Samo życie
 2004–2005: Oficer
 2005–2006: Magda M.
 2006: Klinika samotnych serc
 2006: Oficerowie
 2007: Trzeci oficer
 2008: Ojciec Mateusz
 2009: Teraz albo nigdy!
 2011: Chichot losu
 2012: Misja Afganistan
 2015: Strażacy
 2015: Listy do M. 2

Awards 
Golden Lions Award at the Gdynia Film Festival, 1990 for 300 Miles to Heaven
European Film Award for European Discovery of the Year, 1989 for 300 Miles to Heaven

References

External links 
 

Polish film directors
Polish directors
Krzysztof Kieślowski Film School alumni
1953 births
Living people